BAIC Motor Corporation Limited is a Chinese automaker headquartered in Beijing. The H shares (foreigner share in offshore market) of the company were traded in the Hong Kong Stock Exchange. It was part of BAIC Group, itself a subsidiary of Beijing Municipal Government.

History
BAIC Motor was incorporated in 2010 as a sub-holding company of BAIC Group. It became a listed company in December 2014.

The firm announced plans, in March 2015, to extend its partnership with Daimler AG by taking a 35 percent stake in Mercedes-Benz Leasing, a leasing company incorporated in China.

Products
BAIC has a wide product line that includes more than the buses that are its traditional manufacture. With more known modern day products being the Beijing brand passenger cars and the BJ series crossovers and SUVs of the Beijing Off-road brand.

Beijing

Beijing U5 
Beijing U7
Beijing X3 
Beijing X5 
Beijing X6 (Beijing Mofang)
Beijing X7
Beijing EU5 
Beijing EU260 
Beijing EX360
Beijing EX3 
Beijing EX5 
Beijing EC3 
Beijing EC5 
Beijing EC220

Beijing Off-road
 Beijing BJ30 (BAIC BJ20)
 Beijing BJ40 (BJ40 Plus/BJ40L)
 Beijing BJ60
 Beijing BJ80
 BAIC BJ90

Subsidiaries

 BAIC Investment (97.95%)
 Beijing Hyundai (50%)
 Beijing Beinei Engine Parts and Components (98.975% direct and indirectly)
 Beijing Beinei Motor Spare Parts Sales (100%)
 Beijing Benz Automotive (51%)
 BAIC Motor Powertrain (100%)
 BAIC Hong Kong Investment (100%)
 Zhuzhou (BAIC) Motor Sales (100%)
 BAIC Motor Sales (100%)
 BAIC (Guangzhou) Motor (100%)
 BAIC MB-tech Development Center (51%)

Equity investments

 Fujian Benz Automotive (35%)
 Beijing Mercedes-Benz Sales Service (49%)
 Mercedes-Benz Leasing (35%)
 Beijing Electric Vehicle (8.5%)
 Hyundai Top Selection U-Car (40%)
 Beijing Hyundai Auto Finance (33%)
 BAIC Group Finance (20%)

Shareholders

References

External links
 
 

Vehicle manufacturing companies established in 1958
Manufacturing companies based in Beijing
Companies listed on the Hong Kong Stock Exchange
BAIC Group
Car manufacturers of China
Companies owned by the provincial government of China
Luxury motor vehicle manufacturers
Mercedes-Benz Group
H shares
1958 establishments in China